Mount Auburn Cemetery is a cemetery in Cambridge and Watertown, Massachusetts, United States.

Mount Auburn Cemetery may also refer to:

Mount Auburn Cemetery (Harvard, Illinois), United States
Mount Auburn Cemetery (Baltimore, Maryland), United States

See also
Mount Auburn Cemetery Reception House, an historic building located in the Cambridge, Massachusetts, portion of Mount Auburn Cemetery